Barbara Ruth Staff (August 26, 1924 – July 29, 2019) was an American political activist for the Republican Party who was one of three co-chairs of the 1976 presidential primary campaign for Ronald Reagan in Texas, along with Ernest Angelo Jr., former mayor of Midland, and Ray Barnhart, a former state legislator and a Republican chairman.

Staff died in July 2019 in Plano, Texas at the age of 94.

References

1924 births
2019 deaths
People from Cleburne, Texas
Baptists from Texas
Protestants from Texas
Texas Republicans
People from Dallas
People from Plano, Texas
University of North Texas alumni
Southern Methodist University alumni
Women in Texas politics
20th-century Baptists
21st-century American women